Sakti is a village in the Leh district of Ladakh, India. It is located in the Leh tehsil. The Takthok Monastery is located here.

Demographics 
According to the 2011 census of India, Sakti has 370 households. The effective literacy rate (i.e. the literacy rate of population excluding children aged 6 and below) is 67.7%.

References

Villages in Leh tehsil